is a passenger railway station located in the city of Kami, Kōchi Prefecture, Japan. It is operated by JR Shikoku and has the station number "D35".

Lines

Layout
The station consists of a side platform and an island platform serving three tracks, as illustrated below.

Linked to the side platform is a small building which is unstaffed and serves only as a waiting room. A footbridge connects the side platform to the island platform, which has a weather shelter. A short siding juts partially into the other side of the side platform.

Adjacent stations

History
At this time it was named  and was operated by Japanese Government Railways (JGR), later becoming Japanese National Railways (JNR). On 1 October 1963, it was renamed Shigetō. With the privatization of JNR on 1 April 1987, control of the station passed to JR Shikoku.

On 5 July 1972, what became known as the "Shigetō disaster" occurred. Torrential rain over several days led to a series of landslides which engulfed part of the station and surrounding houses. Two locomotives and two passenger carriages were swept into the river valley below with some of the vehicles being carried onto the opposite bank. There were 60 deaths and the damage to the Dosan Line took 23 days to repair.

Surrounding area
Kami City Shigeto Branch Office
Hokigamine Forest Park
Ananaigawa Dam

See also
 List of Railway Stations in Japan

References

External links

 JR Shikoku timetable

Railway stations in Kōchi Prefecture
Railway stations in Japan opened in 1930
Kami, Kōchi